Marvin Roberto Márquez Joya (born 12 March 1998) is a Salvadoran professional footballer who plays as a forward for the club Isidro Metapán, and the El Salvador national team.

International career
Márquez was called up to represent the El Salvador national team at the 2021 CONCACAF Gold Cup. He debuted with the El Salvador national team in a 2–0 Gold Cup win over Guatemala on 11 July 2021, assisting his side's first goal in the 81st minute.

References

External links
 
 Playmakerstats Profile

1999 births
Living people
Sportspeople from San Salvador
Salvadoran footballers
El Salvador international footballers
El Salvador youth international footballers
Association football forwards
Alianza F.C. footballers
Salvadoran Primera División players
2021 CONCACAF Gold Cup players